Black Dog is a 1998 American action film directed by Kevin Hooks and starring Patrick Swayze. The film tells the story of a trucker and ex-con who is manipulated into transporting illegal arms. The film co-stars popular American singers Randy Travis and Meat Loaf.

Plot
The film starts out with FBI and ATF agents on a pursuit to stop a truck carrying illegal guns as part of an illegal arms operation. The result is the death of the driver, which leads to a disagreement with FBI and ATF agents on involvement with the case.

Truck driver Jack Crews (Patrick Swayze) has just been released from jail for vehicular manslaughter, for accidentally hitting and killing a motorist and his passenger on the side of the road during a trip in which he experienced a Black Dog hallucination brought on by exhaustion. Along with his imprisonment, he also lost his Commercial driver's license. Following his release, he attempts to get back to a normal life, but this time works as a truck mechanic for a local repair shop in New Jersey, unable to drive himself. His manager, Frank Cutler (Graham Beckel), offers him a job driving a load of toilets from Atlanta to New Jersey for $10,000. Jack initially declines the offer, but when he discovers that his house will be repossessed unless he pays off his debt, he then changes his mind and takes the job.

He flies down to Atlanta to meet up with Red (Meat Loaf), who runs the trucking yard. Red initially gives Jack a brand-new truck to haul the load, but Jack chooses an older Peterbilt 379 so as not to draw too much attention. He is accompanied on the trip by Earl (Randy Travis) riding shotgun, and Sonny (Gabriel Casseus) and Wes (Brian Vincent) following in Sonny's Chevrolet Camaro for policy protection. As they make their way to New Jersey, the quartet experience several run-ins with Red and his crew as they attempt to hijack the load, in retaliation for the failed negotiations with Cutler about money. During the trip, Jack finds out that his load also contains illegal guns (over $3,000,000 worth, according to ATF), and that Wes has been informing Red of their whereabouts throughout the trip. Jack also discovers that Sonny is an FBI agent when he is shot and killed by Red during another hijack attempt, and that the FBI has been tracking their whereabouts as well. Jack then reveals to Earl and Wes that he lost his license due to seeing the Black Dog, a herald of destruction for truckers, and how he didn't see the motorist until it was too late.

Things worsen when Cutler takes Jack's wife Melanie and daughter Tracy hostage to ensure that Crews will complete the job and finish the entire trip. Despite the numerous attempts from Red to hijack the load, as well as Sonny's death, Jack manages to survive each attempt. When they make it to Maryland, Jack, aware of the entire plot, formulates a plan to turn over the guns to the FBI and to get his family back. Wes, at this point, has gone his separate way, while Earl decides to stay on until the end. Jack puts the FBI tracking device on the truck that Wes is leaving on and eventually the FBI pulls over the truck to realize it is the wrong one. However, Jack calls Agent Allen Ford (Charles Dutton), who is leading the case, on Wes' cell phone, telling him his plan to meet him at a loading dock in Jersey, where he will be meeting with Cutler to exchange the guns for his family.

When the meeting occurs, the FBI arrives and a shootout occurs with Cutler's men. Jack is able to catch Cutler before he can escape and then turns him over to the FBI. As a token of gratitude, the FBI gives Jack his commercial driver's license back, and also tells the Crewses that their house won't be foreclosed, in return for his assistance during the operation and they thank him for bringing Sonny's body back. He is also given the key to drive the truck one last time to the impound lot. Also, Jack thanks Earl, who was wounded in the shootout between the FBI and Cutler's men, for staying, and in return Earl tells Jack to take care of his dog, Tiny (a pit bull riding in the trailer as a guard), until he heals and everything is sorted out.

As the Crews’ leave the docks for the impound lot, they are intercepted by Red, who makes one last attempt at Jack's life, but ultimately their slamming into each other causes Red to lose control of his truck, which then flips over numerous times before getting hit by a train and exploding.

Cast
 Patrick Swayze as Jack Crews
 Randy Travis as Earl
 Meat Loaf as 'Red'
 Gabriel Casseus as Sonny Boxer
 Brian Vincent as Wes
 Graham Beckel as Frank Cutler
 Brenda Strong as Melanie Crews
 Rusty DeWees as Junior
 Kevin Nash as Norman
 Cyril O'Reilly as Vince
 Erin Broderick as Tracy Crews
 Charles Dutton as FBI Agent Allen Ford
 Stephen Tobolowsky as ATF Agent McClaren
 Lorraine Toussaint as FBI Agent Avery

Production
Prior to the casting of Swayze, the film was initially intended as a vehicle for Kevin Sorbo 

In July 1997, it was announced that Sorbo would star in Black Dog for around $3 million with Kevin Hooks slated to direct and produce with the intention to shoot in September during Sorbo's hiatus from Hercules: The Legendary Journeys. In September, Meat Loaf and Randy Travis were signed to star opposite Sorbo. 

By November of that year, it was reported that Patrick Swayze would star in Black Dog.

Reception
Black Dog received negative reviews by critics, earning a 14% approval rating on Rotten Tomatoes based on 21 reviews. It has received cult status among film enthusiasts and RADwood car enthusiasts alike, as one of the last action road movies to use practical effects, signifying the end of an era.

Audiences polled by CinemaScore gave the film an average grade of "C+" on an A+ to F scale.

Soundtrack

A soundtrack album for the film, featuring various country music artists, was released in April 1998 via Decca Records Nashville. It peaked at number 30 on Top Country Albums.

Content and reception
Thom Owens gave the soundtrack a mixed review in Allmusic, praising the performances of Randy Travis, David Lee Murphy and Rhett Akins.

Among the cuts on the soundtrack, Rhett Akins' "Drivin' My Life Away" (a cover of Eddie Rabbitt) and Linda Davis's "I Wanna Remember This" were both released as singles. Patty Loveless' "On Down the Line" was previously a single from her 1990 album of the same name, and Steve Earle's "Nowhere Road" was a single from his 1987 album Exit 0. David Lee Murphy's "We Can't All Be Angels" also appeared on his 1997 album of the same name, Lee Ann Womack's "A Man with 18 Wheels" previously appeared on her 1997 self-titled debut, Big House's "Road Man" previously appeared on their 1997 self-titled debut, and Chris Knight's "The Hammer Going Down" appeared on his 1998 self-titled debut. "Highway Junkie", recorded here by Gary Allan, was previously recorded by Randy Travis on his 1996 album Full Circle.

Track listing

References

External links
 
 
 

1998 films
1990s English-language films
1990s action drama films
1990s crime action films
American action drama films
American crime action films
Country music films
Mutual Film Company films
Universal Pictures films
Films directed by Kevin Hooks
Films scored by George S. Clinton
1990s road movies
American road movies
Trucker films
Films shot in North Carolina
Films produced by Raffaella De Laurentiis
1998 drama films
1990s American films